The 1992–93 South Midlands League season was 64th in the history of South Midlands League.

At the end of the season the league was reorganized from 2 divisions (Premier, One), to 3 divisions (Premier, Senior, One).

Premier Division

The Premier Division featured 19 clubs which competed in the division last season, along with 3 new clubs:
Luton Old Boys, promoted from Division One.
Arlesey Town, transferred from the United Counties League
Hatfield Town, joined from Herts Senior County League Premier Division as Hatfield Town Athletic

League table

Division One

The Division One featured 19 clubs which competed in the division last season, along with 3 new clubs:
Winslow United, relegated from Premier Division.
De Havilland, joined from Herts Senior County League Division Two
London Colney, joined from Herts Senior County League Premier Division

League table

References

1992-93
8